Big Joe may refer to:

People
 Joe Curtis (1882–1972), American college football player and coach
 Big Joe Duskin (1921–2007), American blues and boogie-woogie pianist
 Big Joe Krash, pseudonym of American rapper KRS-One
 Joseph Lonardo (1884–1927), American Mafia crime boss
 Big Joe Mufferaw, French Canadian folk hero
 Big Joe Nasty, ring name of Joe D'Acquisto, American professional wrestler
 Joe Roberts (actor) (1871–1923), American comic actor
 Joseph Todaro Jr. (born 1945 or 1946), American businessman and alleged Mafia crime boss
 Big Joe Turner (1911–1985), American blues shouter
 Joe Vagana (born 1975), New Zealand former rugby league footballer
 Joe van Niekerk (born 1980), South African former rugby union player
 Big Joe Williams (1903–1982), American Delta blues musician and songwriter
 Big Joe (reggae), Jamaican deejay born Joseph Spalding in 1955

Space exploration
 Big Joe (Project Mercury), a subprogram of Project Mercury
 Big Joe 1, a Project Mercury mission
 Big Joe, a rock on Mars - see List of rocks on Mars

Other uses
 Big Joe (bell), a bell in Saint Francis De Sales Catholic Church, Cincinnati, Ohio
 Big Joe (mascot), the mascot of the Ottawa Redblacks of the Canadian Football League
 Big Joe, Robert Een's band
 Big Joe, a novel by Samuel R. Delany

See also
 Joseph Massino (born 1943), American former Mafia crime boss nicknamed "Big Joey"

Lists of people by nickname